The Nordic Championships was a Motorcycle speedway final sanctioned by the FIM. In 1952 it became a qualifying round for the Speedway World Championship. From 1995 to 2001 it was known as the Scandinavian Final.

Format
To Continental Final, 1953–1954
To European final, 1955–1965, 1967, 1969, 1972
To British Nordic Final, 1966, 1968, 1970–1971, 1973–1974
To Intercontinental Final, 1975–1990, 1995–2001
To World semi final, 1991–1994

Winners

Medal classification

See also
 Speedway World Championship
 Speedway Grand Prix
 Motorcycle speedway

References